Cordillera Real is the name of mountain chains in the Andes of South America:
Cordillera Real (Ecuador)
Cordillera Real (Bolivia)